On 31 October 2016, a modified DHC-4 Caribou transport aircraft operated by Alfa Indonesia crashed in the Papuan jungle while en route to Ilaga Airport in Ilaga, Indonesia. The flight was operated by Alfa Indonesia as a chartered cargo flight with four people on board. There were no survivors among the four crew members on board.

Background 
Infrastructure is still a big issue in Eastern Indonesia. For the past few years, the Indonesian Government had only concentrated its development on the island of Java and Sumatra, causing a massive difference in the infrastructure of those on the west and those on the east. Gasoline and oil were far more expensive than those in Java. The government reigned by Joko Widodo then started to focus its infrastructure development in eastern Indonesia particularly in Papua, by adding more transportation so essential things like gasoline and oil could easily reach remote areas in Papua. In September 2016, to decrease the oil price in Puncak Regency, the government bought a DHC-4 Caribou to the region.

Aircraft 
The aircraft involved in the crash was a PEN Turbo DHC-4T Turbo Caribou, a de Havilland Canada DHC-4 Caribou modified with Pratt & Whitney Canada PT6-67A turboprop engines. Built in 1971, it first flew in modified form in September 2014. In May 2016 the aircraft was delivered to Indonesia, and entered service in September. It was registered in Indonesia as PK-SWW. It was jointly owned by the Indonesian government and the Puncak Regency local government. The four crew on board were Indonesians.

Disappearance 
The Caribou took off from Timika at 07:57 a.m. local time with an estimated time of arrival at 08:22, carrying construction materials. At 08:23, the crew made their first radio contact with Ilaga Tower and reported their position, which was on Ilaga Pass, a valley near Ilaga. After reporting their estimated time of arrival at Ilaga, contact with the tower was suddenly lost at 08:27 a.m.

At 09:22 a.m., the crew of another aircraft reported to Ilaga that they had received a signal suspected to have come from the missing aircraft's emergency locator transmitter near Jila. A search and rescue team was quickly assembled by the National Search and Rescue Agency. Local authorities and residents also joined the search operation. However, heavy rain and limited visibility hampered the search and rescue operation and it was postponed. The search and rescue team, consisting of personnel from the Indonesian Air Force, the National Search and Rescue Agency, the Indonesian Army and the Indonesian National Police along with two helicopters, set up three main camps in response to the disappearance. Two fixed-wing aircraft were also deployed.

Discovery of the wreckage 
The aircraft was totally burnt out with wreckage strewn over the valley. The impact was so severe that there was no chance of finding any survivors. After the discovery, two helicopters were deployed to evacuate the bodies from the crash site and bring them to Timika, where a procession was held to honour the victims.

Investigation 
The National Transportation Safety Committee was ordered to investigate the crash and had received the debris of the aircraft. Both the Flight Data Recorder and Cockpit Voice Recorder were still missing. On 6 November, both the FDR and the CVR were found and were recovered by search team. Both later were sent to the NTSC facility in Jakarta for further analysis.

The interim report included a recommendation to Perkumpulan Penerbangan Alfa Indonesia "to comply the DGCA Safety Circular number SE.24 of 2016".

See also 
Aviastar Flight 7503
Trigana Air Service Flight 267

References 

Aviation accidents and incidents in 2016
Aviation accidents and incidents in Indonesia
Accidents and incidents involving the de Havilland Canada DHC-4 Caribou
2016 in Indonesia
October 2016 events in Indonesia